Chikkanna (born 22 June 1984), is an Indian actor who works in Kannada cinema and appears primarily in comic roles. He made his debut in films with Kirataka (2011), following which he was recognized for his performances in Raja Huli (2013) and Adyaksha (2014).

Career
Chikkanna began his acting career in comedy shows in Mysore with Drishya Kalavide. He then appeared Comedy Kiladigalu in Zee Kannada and  Prank Show aired on Udaya TV. Actor Yash noticed his performance at the diamond jubilee celebrations of Kannada cinema and cast him in the 2011 film, Kirataka. In Raja Huli (2013) and Adyaksha (2014), he played roles alongside Yash and Sharan. In the 2015 film Sharp Shooter, he played alongside Diganth and wrote the lyrics for the track "Kuntebille".

Filmography

References

External links
 

Living people
Indian male film actors
Indian male television actors
Male actors in Kannada cinema
Kannada people
Male actors from Mysore
21st-century Indian male actors
Male actors in Kannada television
1986 births
Male actors in Telugu cinema